Patricia Nixon Cox ( Nixon; born February 21, 1946) is the elder daughter of the 37th United States president Richard Nixon and First Lady Pat Nixon, and sister to Julie Nixon Eisenhower.

She is married to Edward F. Cox and is the mother of Christopher Nixon Cox.

In her father's public career, Cox performed a ceremonial role, in contrast to Julie's more political involvement. She accompanied him on many campaign stops and, after his inauguration, on state trips around the world.

Early life
Cox was born on February 21, 1946, at Murphy Memorial Hospital in Whittier, California. She grew up in Washington, DC, attending Horace Mann Elementary and the Sidwell Friends School. Later she attended the Chapin School in Manhattan.

In 1964, she was presented as a debutante to high society at the prestigious International Debutante Ball at the Waldorf-Astoria Hotel in New York City. Edward Cox was her civilian escort at the International Debutante Ball.

She briefly attended Finch College, a now-defunct women's college, then Boston College in Boston, Massachusetts, graduating in 1968 with a Bachelor of Arts in English. At her graduation on June 14, 1968, her father served as a special guest speaker.

Marriage and professional activities

Tricia Nixon married Harvard Law student Edward F. Cox in a White House Rose Garden ceremony on June 12, 1971.

In a 2015 interview with Max Foster for CNN regarding an upcoming visit to the United States, Charles, then Prince of Wales recalled his first visit to the U.S. in 1970 as "the time when they were trying to marry me off to Tricia Nixon" who was nearly three years his senior and American. Nixon had represented the U.S. government along with former Vice President Hubert H. Humphrey at  Charles' investiture in Caernarvon Wales one year earlier in July 1969.

She has lived a very private life in the suburbs of New York, and was a stay-at-home mother for her son, Christopher Nixon Cox, born in March 1979. Her husband is now a corporate attorney and was a chairman of the New York Republican State Committee. She serves on the boards of many medical research institutions, as well as the Richard Nixon Foundation at the Nixon Library in California.

Notes

1946 births
20th-century American women
21st-century American women
American debutantes
Morrissey College of Arts & Sciences alumni
California Republicans
Children of presidents of the United States
Children of vice presidents of the United States
Debutantes of the International Debutante Ball
Finch College alumni
Living people
People from Whittier, California
Nixon family
Sidwell Friends School alumni
Chapin School (Manhattan) alumni